The Singapore Marathon is an annual international marathon race which is held on the first Sunday of December in the city of Singapore. It is a World Athletics Gold Label Road Race.

History 
The first competitive marathon in Singapore was held on 5 December 1982, with an estimated participation size of 15,000 runners. Only the 2,300 competitive runners would have to register while the non-competitive runners could freely as joggers along the route. It has grown significantly since its inaugural race in 1982 – the 2013 event attracted a total of 60,000 entrants for all categories.

In 2017, Singapore was announced as a candidate city for the Abbott World Marathon Majors, a series of the six largest and most renowned marathons in the world. In 2019, the full- and half-marathons were held in the evening in order to fulfill criteria to be listed in the Abbott World Marathon Majors, instead of the usual flag off timing at dawn. This led to a series of road closures which resulted in 3-hour long traffic jams around the city center on the race day itself as there were other major activities happening at the same time in the vicinity of the race.

Race 
There are four separate categories of competition: the full marathon, the half marathon, the 10 kilometres run, and the 10 km wheelchair race. Furthermore, 10 km team competitions as well as a number of short running competitions for children.

Prize money for the full marathon race is divided into three categories: the open prize (for all competitors), the Singapore prize (open to national competitors), and the veteran prize (which acts as a masters competition).

Between 2004 and 2008, it was part of "The Greatest Race on Earth" series of road races, sponsored by Standard Chartered Singapore (the other three legs being the Hong Kong Marathon, Mumbai Marathon and Nairobi Marathon).

The times recorded at the Singapore Marathon tend to be slower than those at other marathons as Singapore's climate is usually hot and humid. Kenyans Luke Kibet and Salina Kosgei are the men's and women's course record holders, respectively. The 2006 edition also acted as the country's national championships, with Elangovan Ganesan and Vivian Tan Yoke Pin taking the honours.

In 2020, Singapore Marathon moved its race event to a virtual format due to the advisories surrounding the COVID-19 pandemic. The virtual race format, titled "Standard Chartered Singapore Marathon (SCSM) Virtual Racing Series" is part of the SCSM Virtual Club initiative. Two new virtual races are made available each week for participation by runners all over the world.

List of winners
Key:

Statistics

Winners by country

Multiple winners

See also
Sundown Marathon

References
General
Singapore Marathon. Association of Road Racing Statisticians (2009-01-24). Retrieved on 2009-11-19.
 Standard Chartered Marathon Singapore(Singapore Marathon)Official Site
Specific

External links 
 A Run Through The Past - History of running and the human marathon.
 Why I Run the Marathon Memoirs of a runner who has completed 7 Singapore Marathons.

Marathons in Singapore
Standard Chartered
Recurring sporting events established in 1982